Heinz Grobat is a Swiss retired slalom canoeist who competed from the early 1960s to the early 1970s. He won a bronze medal in the C-1 team event at the 1963 ICF Canoe Slalom World Championships in Spittal.

References

Swiss male canoeists
Possibly living people
Year of birth missing (living people)
Medalists at the ICF Canoe Slalom World Championships